Eczemotellus is a genus of beetle in the family Cerambycidae. Its only species is Eczemotellus subtilipectus. It was described by Heller in 1924.

References

Pteropliini
Beetles described in 1924